The First Secretary of the Nagorno-Karabakh Autonomous Oblast Committee of the Communist Party of Azerbaijan was the head of the Communist Party of Azerbaijan in the Nagorno-Karabakh Autonomous Oblast and the highest executive power in the oblast of the Azerbaijan Soviet Socialist Republic of the Soviet Union. The position was created in July 1923, and abolished on August 27, 1990. The position of First Secretary was, de facto appointed by the Politburo of the Soviet Union or by the General Secretary of the Communist Party of the Soviet Union. Below is a list of office-holders:

Sources
 World Statesmen.org

Nagorno-Karabakh Autonomous Oblast
Politics of the Republic of Artsakh
Azerbaijanian SSR
Lists of political office-holders in Azerbaijan
List
List
1923 establishments in the Soviet Union
1990 disestablishments in the Soviet Union
Nagorno–Karabakh